Jinliu "Grace" Wang is a Chinese American engineer and academic administrator who served as interim president of the SUNY Polytechnic Institute from July 1, 2018 to November 2020.  She joined Ohio State University in December 2020 as executive vice president for research, innovation, and knowledge enterprise.

Education 
Wang earned her Bachelor and Master of Science degrees in polymer materials from the Beijing University of Chemical Technology, followed by a PhD in materials science and engineering from Northwestern University.

Career 
Wang began her career at IBM and Hitachi, focusing on the research and development of magnetic thin film and carbon overcoat for data storage. She holds seven U.S. patents. Wang joined National Science Foundation (NSF) in June 2009 as a program director for the SBIR/STTR Program, focusing on investing in small businesses in the areas of
nanotechnology, advanced materials, and manufacturing. She later became the division director of Industrial Innovation and Partnerships (IIP), deputy assistant director, and acting assistant director for engineering at the NSF. 

Wang became the vice chancellor for research and economic development at the State University of New York in 2017 and also served as SUNY's interim system provost for the 2017–2018 school year. She also worked as a professor of engineering at the University at Buffalo. Wang was appointed interim president by the board of trustees and SUNY Chancellor Kristina M. Johnson in June 2018.

In December 2020, Wang joined Ohio State University as executive vice president for research, innovation, and knowledge enterprise.

On November 7, 2022, it was announced that Wang would be the 17th president of Worcester Polytechnic Institute starting on April 3, 2023.

References 

Northwestern University alumni
Beijing University of Chemical Technology alumni
University at Buffalo faculty
SUNY Polytechnic Institute
Chinese engineers
Chinese academic administrators
Women academic administrators

Year of birth missing (living people)
Living people